is a 1957 Japanese romantic musical film directed by Toshio Sugie. It was Toho's highest-grossing film of the year and the first film released in Tohoscope.

Production
On Wings of Love was the third film in the Sannin Musume series of romantic musical films.

Release
On Wings of Love was released theatrically in Japan on 13 July 1957 where it was distributed by Toho. It was the first film released in Toho Scope, Toho's 2.35:1 anamorphic wide screen system.

The film was Toho highest-grossing film of 1957 and the only film to make the top ten highest-grossing films in Japan in 1957, at ninth place.

Cast
The main cast of On Wings of Love are:
 Hibari Misora
 Izumi Yukimura
 Setsuko Wakayama
 Yaeko Izumo
 Tsuneko Ozawa
 Chiemi Eri
 Akira Takarada
 Shinji Yamada
 Sumiko Koizumi

References

Footnotes

Sources

External links
 

1957 films
Japanese black-and-white films
Films directed by Toshio Sugie
Toho films
Japanese romantic musical films
1950s romantic musical films
1950s Japanese films